Claude Barrows Jennings (5 June 1884 – 20 June 1950) was a cricketer who played for South Australia, Queensland and Australia.

Jennings was a right-hand opening batsman and occasional wicket-keeper who had a fairly undistinguished domestic cricketing career in Australia in which he scored just one century and averaged, in first-class matches, little over 20 runs per innings. He owed his selection for the Australian team that contested the 1912 Triangular Tournament in England to the dispute between the Australian Cricket Board of Control and senior players, including Clem Hill and Victor Trumper, which led to six leading players being omitted from the touring party.

On the tour, Jennings played in all six Test matches, three each against England and South Africa. In eight innings, two of them not out, he scored 107 runs with a highest of 32 in his very first Test innings, against South Africa at Manchester. He did not keep wicket in the Tests. On the tour as a whole, he scored 1037 runs, with a highest score of 82.

He retired from first-class cricket after the tour and went into business administration, acting as a British trade representative in South Australia and as secretary of the Adelaide Chamber of Commerce.

References

External links

1884 births
1950 deaths
Australia Test cricketers
South Australia cricketers
Queensland cricketers
Australian cricketers
Cricketers from Melbourne